Scopula bimacularia is a moth of the family Geometridae. It was described by John Henry Leech in 1897. It is found in western China.

References

Moths described in 1897
Moths of Asia
bimacularia
Taxa named by John Henry Leech